The 1951–52 FA Cup was the 71st season of the world's oldest football cup competition, the Football Association Challenge Cup, commonly known as the FA Cup. Newcastle United won the competition for the fifth time, beating Arsenal 1–0 in the final at Wembley.

Matches were scheduled to be played at the stadium of the team named first on the date specified for each round, which was always a Saturday. Some matches, however, might be rescheduled for other days if there were clashes with games for other competitions or the weather was inclement. If scores were level after 90 minutes had been played, a replay would take place at the stadium of the second-named team later the same week. If the replayed match was drawn further replays would be held until a winner was determined. If scores were level after 90 minutes had been played in a replay, a 30-minute period of extra time would be played.

Calendar

First round proper

At this stage clubs from the Football League Third Division North and South joined those non-league clubs having come through the qualifying rounds (except Bishop Auckland and Bromley, who given byes to this round). Matches were scheduled to be played on Saturday, 24 November 1951. Eight were drawn and went to replays, with three of these going to second replays.

Second round proper
The matches were played on Saturday, 15 December 1951. Seven matches were drawn, with replays taking place later the same week. Three of these replays went to a second replay, with the Tranmere Rovers–Blyth Spartans game going to a third.

Third round proper
The 44 First and Second Division clubs entered the competition at this stage. The matches were scheduled for Saturday, 12 January 1952. Nine matches were drawn and went to replays, with one of these going to a second replay.

Fourth round proper
The matches were scheduled for Saturday, 2 February 1952, with the exception of two postponed matches. Three games were drawn and went to replays, which were all played in the following midweek match. One of these then went to a second replay before being settled.

Fifth round proper
The matches were scheduled for Saturday, 23 February 1952. The Leeds United–Chelsea game went to two replays before Chelsea won the tie.

Sixth round proper
The four Sixth Round ties were scheduled to be played on Saturday, 8 March 1952. There were no replays.

Semi-finals
The semi-final matches were intended to be played on Saturday, 29 March 1952, although the Chelsea–Arsenal fixture was not played until the week after. Both matches went to a replay, with Arsenal and Newcastle United eventually winning their ties to meet in the final at Wembley.

Replay

Replay

Final

The 1952 FA Cup Final took place at Wembley Stadium. It was contested between cup holders Newcastle United and Arsenal. Newcastle won 1–0 with a late goal from Chilean striker George Robledo

Match facts

See also
FA Cup Final Results 1872-

References
General
Official site; fixtures and results service at TheFA.com
1951-52 FA Cup at rssf.com
1951-52 FA Cup at soccerbase.com

Specific

 
FA Cup seasons